Donnally may refer to:

People
Edward W. Donnally, American Naval officer and namesake of Donnally Glacier 
Places
Donnally Glacier, an Antarctic glacier
Fort Donnally, West Virginia
Donnally Mills in Perry County, Pennsylvania
Fiction
Harlan Donnally, protagonist of a series of novels by Steven Gore
Matt Donnally, character on Necessary Roughness (TV series)
Other
Edward Donnally Award, athletic honor given at University of Vermont

See also
Donnell
McDonnall (disambiguation)
Donnally (disambiguation)
Donnelly (disambiguation)
Donal (disambiguation)